Maree Therese Smith  is an Australian researcher, inventor and innovator based at the University of Queensland. She is executive director of the Centre for Integrated Preclinical Drug Development, and TetraQ (a drug testing facility), head of the Pain Research Group in the UQ School of Pharmacy, and the inventor and developer of a potential novel treatment for chronic pain, EMA401.

Smith received a 2012 Life Sciences Queensland Industry Award for Excellence, the 2015 Johnson & Johnson Innovation Industry Excellence Award for biotech industry leadership, and the 2016 Australian Academy of Technological Sciences and Engineering Clunies Ross Award for contributions to the application of technology for the benefit of Australia. She was elected a Fellow of the Australian Academy of Health and Medical Sciences in 2015.

References

Australian pharmacists
Living people
Companions of the Order of Australia
Fellows of the Australian Academy of Health and Medical Sciences
Fellows of the Australian Academy of Technological Sciences and Engineering
Year of birth missing (living people)